John M. Warner is a North Dakota Democratic-NPL Party member of the North Dakota Senate, representing the 4th district since 2004. He was previously a member of the North Dakota House of Representatives from 1997 through 2003.

External links
North Dakota State Legislature – Senator John M. Warner official ND Senate website
Project Vote Smart – Senator John M. Warner (ND) profile
Follow the Money – John Warner
2006 2004 2000 1998 campaign contributions
North Dakota Democratic-NPL Party – Senator John M. Warner profile

North Dakota state senators
Members of the North Dakota House of Representatives
1952 births
Living people
Minot State University alumni
People from Minot, North Dakota
21st-century American politicians